Ricky Duran (born August 31, 1989) is an American rock singer. He is the runner-up of season 17 of the American talent competition The Voice behind the winner Jake Hoot.

Early life
Ricky Duran was born on August 31, 1989, in Worcester, Massachusetts. He is of Guatemalan descent. He grew up in Grafton, MA. His parents, Ricardo and Odette Duran, immigrated to Massachusetts from Guatemala. He is the youngest of four, having three older sisters. He was given a scholarship to attend Berklee School of Music.  He graduated in 2011. Both his parents died while he was still young and in his twenties. His father died in 2012 by suicide and his mother died from breast cancer in 2018.

Career
In 2019, Duran entered the 17th season of The Voice after an unsuccessful attempt in the 6th season. In his blind audition, He sang "River" by Leon Bridges. all four coaches turned their chairs and gave a standing ovation. Ricky chose to become a member of Team Blake. He made it to the finale and became the runner-up on December 17, 2019.

In December 2020, Ricky released his first single after his time on the Voice, "She Closed Her Eyes", to rave reviews.  It hit number 1 on the Singer Songwriter Charts.

The Voice (2019)

The Voice performances

Discography

Singles

References

https://www.telegram.com/news/20191211/nothing-but-celebration-for-the-voice-finalist-ricky-duran

https://www.masslive.com/worcester/2019/12/worcesters-ricky-duran-talks-2nd-place-victory-on-nbcs-the-voice-exciting-offers-for-his-career.html

External links
 - (October 7, 2019)
 - (December 17, 2019)

1989 births
21st-century American singers
Singer-songwriters from Massachusetts
American male singer-songwriters
American new wave musicians
Living people
People from Worcester, Massachusetts
The Voice (franchise) contestants
21st-century American male singers